Comperia may refer to:
 Comperia (plant), a flowering plant genus in the family Orchidaceae
 Comperia (wasp), a wasp genus in the family Encyrtidae